Richard James Umbers (born 17 March 1971) is an Australian Catholic bishop. He is currently an auxiliary bishop of the Archdiocese of Sydney and the youngest Catholic bishop in Australia. He is also the first priest of Opus Dei to be appointed a bishop in Australia.

Early life
Umbers was born in Otahuhu, New Zealand, on 17 March 1971 to Declan (1927–2013) and Mary (1933–2019) Umbers. He is the youngest of five children and the brother of Anthony, Andrew, Gregory and Margaret. He was raised in Papatoetoe. He originally studied management at the University of Waikato in 1989 but transferred to the University of Sydney in 1992 to receive more intense formation at a centre of Opus Dei in Chatswood, New South Wales. He graduated with a Bachelor of Economics from the University of Sydney and a Masters of Management from the University of Waikato, New Zealand.

Priesthood
Umbers entered the Opus Dei seminary in Cavabianca, Rome, in 1996 and studied at Santa Croce Pontifical University, Rome, achieving a Bachelor of Theology degree in 1999. Between 1999 and 2002, Umbers studied at the University of Navarre, Spain, where he received a Doctor of Philosophy degree. On 14 February 2002 he was ordained a deacon and was subsequently ordained a priest by Bishop Javier Echevarría, a prelate of Opus Dei, on 1 September 2002 at the Marian shrine of Torreciudad, Spain.

Umbers has been based in Sydney since 2003, and has been chaplain of several educational institutions including Warrane College (2003–04; 2012–16) and Creston College (2012–16), residential colleges affiliated with the University of New South Wales, and Redfield College (2005–11), a school of the Parents for Education foundation. He has been a lecturer for the Centre for Faith, Ethics and Society at the University of Notre Dame Australia.

Episcopate
Umbers was appointed Auxiliary Bishop of Sydney by Pope Francis on 24 June 2016 along with Anthony Randazzo, he was given the titular see of Thala in Tunisia. They were consecrated by Anthony Fisher on 24 August 2016 in St Mary's Cathedral, Sydney. He sits on the council of priests of the Archdiocese of Sydney on behalf of Fisher and is a representative for the archdiocese to the St John of God hospitals. He is published in the field of philosophy, regularly addresses youth gatherings, has an interest in social media, and has a library of his own podcasts. He runs a Twitter account named "Bishop Down Umber", the name of which is a pun on his nationality, and a Christianity and Theology themed meme page on Instagram named "bishopumbers".

References

External links
Umbers on Twitter
Umbers on Facebook

Australian people of Irish descent
21st-century Roman Catholic bishops in Australia
University of Waikato alumni
1971 births
Internet memes introduced in 2015
Living people
Religious leaders from Auckland
New Zealand emigrants to Australia
Opus Dei members
Roman Catholic bishops of Sydney